Luostarinen is a Finnish surname. Notable people with the surname include:

 Alpo Luostarinen (1886–1948), Finnish farmer and politician
 Eetu Luostarinen (born 1998), Finnish ice hockey player
 Esko Luostarinen (born 1935), professional ice hockey player
 Päivi Luostarinen (born 1955), Finnish diplomat
 Reijo Luostarinen (born 1939) Finnish organisational theorist
 Leena Luostarinen (1949–2013), Finnish painter
 Sanna Luostarinen (born 1976), Finnish actress

Finnish-language surnames